Holy Ghost is an unincorporated community in San Miguel County, New Mexico, United States.

The United States Forest Service translated the area's Spanish name, Espiritu Santo (Holy Spirit), and applied it to a campground, summer home area and creek located there.

The Forest Service describes the Holy Ghost Campground as "situated in a beautiful steep canyon right along Holy Ghost Creek".

References

Unincorporated communities in San Miguel County, New Mexico
Unincorporated communities in New Mexico